The 63rd Golden Globe Awards, honoring the best in film and television for 2005, were presented on January 16, 2006, at the Beverly Hilton Hotel, in Los Angeles, California. The nominations were announced on December 13, 2005.

The ceremony aired on Monday rather than its traditional Sunday after the previous year ceremony's ratings were negatively impacted by the popularity of Desperate Housewives.

Winners and nominees

These are the nominees for the 63rd Golden Globe Awards. Winners are listed at the top of each list.

Film

The following films received multiple nominations:

The following films received multiple wins:

Television

The following  programs received multiple nominations:

The following films and programs received multiple wins:

Ceremony

Presenters 

 Jessica Alba
 Pamela Anderson
 Eric Bana
 Drew Barrymore
 Kate Beckinsale
 Adrien Brody
 Mariah Carey
 Penélope Cruz
 Rosario Dawson
 Catherine Deneuve
 Leonardo DiCaprio
 Matt Dillon
 Josh Duhamel
 Clint Eastwood
 Colin Firth
 Harrison Ford
 Jamie Foxx
 Melanie Griffith
 Teri Hatcher
 Sean Hayes
 Jill Hennessy
 Evangeline Lilly
 Virginia Madsen
 Jesse L. Martin
 Matthew McConaughey
 Eric McCormack
 Tim McGraw
 Julian McMahon
 Ian McShane
 Debra Messing
 Mandy Moore
 Megan Mullally
 Gwyneth Paltrow
 Sarah Jessica Parker
 William Petersen
 Natalie Portman
 Dennis Quaid
 Queen Latifah
 Tim Robbins
 Chris Rock
 Emmy Rossum
 Brandon Routh
 Nicollette Sheridan
 Hilary Swank
 Emma Thompson
 John Travolta
 Denzel Washington
 Luke Wilson
 Renee Zellweger

Cecil B. DeMille Award 
Anthony Hopkins

Awards breakdown 
The following networks received multiple nominations:

The following networks received multiple wins:

Trivia
 "E!" network covered the Golden Globes for six hours prior to the airing of the event.
 At no time during the telecast was a "tribute" made to those in the entertainment industry who have passed on within the past year.

See also
 78th Academy Awards
 26th Golden Raspberry Awards
 12th Screen Actors Guild Awards
 57th Primetime Emmy Awards
 58th Primetime Emmy Awards
 59th British Academy Film Awards
 60th Tony Awards
 2005 in film
 2005 in American television

References

063
2005 film awards
2005 television awards
2006 in California
January 2006 events in the United States
2005 awards in the United States